Adoration (known in North America and the U.K. as Adore and in France as Perfect Mothers) is a 2013 drama film directed by Anne Fontaine. It is Fontaine's first English-language film. It stars Naomi Watts, Robin Wright, Ben Mendelsohn, Xavier Samuel, and James Frecheville. The film tells the story of a pair of middle-aged women who are life-long friends and have sex with each other's teenage sons, and the resultant emotional consequences of their ongoing affairs. It is based on a 2003 novella by British writer Doris Lessing called The Grandmothers.

The film premiered at the 2013 Sundance Film Festival under its original title Two Mothers.

Plot

In New South Wales, childhood friends Roz and Lil and their families live next door to each other. Roz's son Tom and Lil's son Ian, who are both 18, are also best friends, and the four of them spend all their time together.

Roz's husband Harold is offered a job in Sydney, and goes there to make arrangements, even though Roz does not want to move. That night, Ian kisses Roz, and although she is hesitant the two of them end up having sex. Tom witnesses Roz coming out of Ian's room. Confused and frustrated, Tom tries to seduce Lil, who pushes him away, and he tells her what he witnessed. That night, he stays at her house again, and they have sex.

Roz goes to Lil's work and they discuss what happened with their sons. They agree that they both crossed the line, and that it should never happen again. They get together with both of the boys and tell them that these things need to end. Ian still has feelings for Roz, and eventually, they renew the relationship; they then learn that Lil and Tom never stopped sleeping together. Both Roz and Lil admit that they're happy, and they agree to keep going. When Harold returns, Roz tells him that neither she nor Tom can move with him to Sydney.

Two years later, Roz and Harold are divorced, and Roz and Lil have continued their secret affairs. Ian now works with his mother for a successful yacht-building company, and Tom is studying theater. Harold invites Tom to Sydney to direct one of their plays and Tom accepts, staying with Harold and his new family. While in Sydney, he meets Mary, who is auditioning for the lead role. The two begin a relationship, and Lil reluctantly accepts that he has moved on. Roz and Ian are still together, although Roz believes that Ian will not be attracted to her for much longer. Finally, the mothers agree to end their affairs with the boys. Ian is upset, and storms out.

Some time later, Tom marries Mary. Ian meets a girl at the wedding, Hannah, and decides to have sex with her to get back at Roz. That night, he comes to Roz' door and begs to be let in, but Roz turns him down, crying quietly in her room. Ian goes surfing but suffers a broken leg in the process. He refuses to see Roz, but Hannah comes to visit him and nurses him through his physical therapy. They begin a relationship, but when Ian and Tom meet up for lunch, Ian mentions that it is going nowhere, and that he'll have to break it off. One day, Hannah shows up at Ian's work and tells him that she is pregnant.

Years pass, and now Ian and Tom are both married, and they both have daughters, Shirley and Alice. Mary and Hannah, Tom and Ian's wives respectively, are ignorant of the affairs. They all spend a day together at the beach, and while most are in the water, Ian and Roz share a quiet moment. That night, they all eat dinner together, during which Tom gets drunk and takes a walk to clear his head. Ian follows him and sees him having sex with Lil. Enraged, he tells Mary the truth. The wives are horrified, and leave with the children.

When Tom returns later, he finds Roz sitting alone in her room, and she tells Tom that she doesn't think that Mary, Hannah, or their granddaughters will ever return. Lil tearfully insists that she and Tom tried to stop, but could not keep away from each other. Roz has no words for Lil.

Time passes, and Ian goes for a swim in the ocean until he comes to a free-floating dock in the water, the same dock where he first began his flirtation with Roz, and Roz and Lil used to swim to as girls. He climbs on board and sees that Tom, Lil, and Roz are there. After telling them good morning, he lies down beside Roz.

Cast
 Naomi Watts as Lil
 Robin Wright as Roz
 Ben Mendelsohn as Harold
 Xavier Samuel as Ian
 James Frecheville as Tom
 Jessica Tovey as Mary
 Sophie Lowe as Hannah
 Gary Sweet as Saul

Reception

Critical response
The film has received mostly negative reviews. Of 75 reviews counted by Rotten Tomatoes, 33% were positive, with a rating average of 4.70/10. The site's consensus reads: "Naomi Watts and Robin Wright give it their all, but they can't quite make Adores trashy, absurd plot believable." Metacritic counted 24 reviews with an average score of 37/100, indicating "generally unfavorable reviews".

The Guardians Damon Wise, in positive review that awarded the film 4 out of 5 stars, wrote the film is "An incredibly provocative piece of work, featuring a brave and vulnerable performance by Naomi Watts (who seems perhaps a little too young) and a career-high acting masterclass from Robin Wright (who is cast perfectly)."

Writing for RogerEbert.com, critic Christy Lemire praised the photography and Wright and Watts' acting, but critiqued the story's descent into melodrama. Lemire added, "'Adore' is decadent fantasy fulfillment masquerading as a declaration of feminist independence. Somewhere in here is a message about the importance of remaining sexy and vital in your 40s—about asserting your own identity once more after decades of being defined as someone's wife and someone's mother."  In a review for Grantland, Wesley Morris called the film "an enjoyably shallow movie."

Accolades

Adoration was nominated for the following awards:

Production
Adoration was filmed in New South Wales. The houses and main beach scenes were filmed at Seal Rocks, with some beach scenes filmed at Sugarloaf Point Lighthouse beach. Scenes for where the characters worked were filmed at Shelly Beach and the pub scenes were filmed in Balmain. Parts of the film were also shot in Sydney.

References

External links
 
 
 
 Two Mothers -Naomi Watts as Lil-
 Two Mothers -Robin Wright as Roz-

2013 films
2013 independent films
2013 romantic drama films
Adultery in films
Australian independent films
Australian romantic drama films
2010s English-language films
Films about dysfunctional families
Films about friendship
Films directed by Anne Fontaine
Films set in New South Wales
Films shot in New South Wales
Films shot in Sydney
French independent films
French romantic drama films
English-language French films
2010s female buddy films
2010s French films